Sonic Jihad may refer to:

 Sonic Jihad (Snake River Conspiracy album), 2000 debut from the rock band Snake River Conspiracy
 Sonic Jihad (Paris album), 2003 album from rapper Paris